Tomás Brito Lara (born 11 January 1958) is a Mexican politician affiliated with the PRD. He currently serves as Deputy of the LXII Legislature of the Mexican Congress representing Tabasco.

References

1958 births
Living people
Politicians from Tabasco
People from Cárdenas, Tabasco
Party of the Democratic Revolution politicians
21st-century Mexican politicians
Deputies of the LXII Legislature of Mexico
Members of the Chamber of Deputies (Mexico) for Tabasco